Sten Lundin (20 November 1931 – 3 June 2016) was a Swedish professional motocross racer. He competed in the Motocross World Championships from 1955 to 1966. Between 1955 and 1964, Lundin placed in the top three competitors of the 500cc Motocross World Championships.

Motocross career
Lundin won the F.I.M. 500cc motocross world championship in 1959 riding a Monark. In the 1960 world championship, he finished in second place, two points behind Bill Nilsson. In 1961 he recaptured the 500cc world championship riding a Monark which had been re-badged as a Lito. He dropped to third place in the world championship in 1962, finished second to Rolf Tibblin in the 1963 world championship and, third in the 1964 world championship. Lundin was also a member of the victorious Swedish team at the 1955 Motocross des Nations.

Lundin died on 3 June 2016.

References

External links
 Sten Lundin and his championship winning motorcycle
 1963 Monark 500 at the Motorcycle Hall of Fame
 British Pathé Newsreel film Lundin victory at 1961 International Motocross race in Oberstorf, Germany

1931 births
2016 deaths
Sportspeople from Stockholm
Swedish motocross riders